Sergei Alexandrovich Markov (born 18 April 1958) is a Russian political scientist, journalist and former close advisor to Russian President Vladimir Putin. He is a Doctor of Political Science, assistant professor of Public Policy department of Faculty of Philosophy at Moscow State University, professor of the Faculty of Political Science at the Moscow State Institute of International Relations (MGIMO-University), director of the Institute of Political Studies. He was also a member of the Presidential Commission of the Russian Federation to Counter Attempts to Falsify History to the Detriment of Russia's Interests that existed between 2009 and 2012.

He is also a Deputy Chairman of the Russian Public Forum on International Affairs. Markov serves as co-Chairman of the National Strategic Council of Russia and is a member of the Presidential Council for Facilitating the Development of Civil Society Institutions and Human Rights of the Russian Federation.

Academic roles
    
Markov, as a political analyst, has published numerous articles in prestigious national and international publications. Since 2000 has been a consultant for a variety of Russian and international organizations including the State Duma of the Russian Federation, the Supreme Council of the Russian Federation, the National Democratic Institute of International Relations, Chase Manhattan Bank and ING Baring.

Dr. Markov is a professor at the Moscow State Institute of International Relations and a lecturer of the Philosophy Department at Moscow State University, where he obtained his degree.

Political office
From 2006 to 2008 he was a member of the Public Chamber of Russia. In the 2007 election he was elected to the State Duma, representing United Russia.

Markov denies Russian involvement in the poisoning of Alexander Litvinenko, which was perpetrated with Polonium-210 from a Russian reactor and which the British security services believe to have been conducted on behalf of the Russian government. He also attributes the Russian apartment bombings by Chechen terrorists to Russian businessmen forced from the country to exile in Britain. Markov comments on many other foreign policy questions, attributing the conflict in South Ossetia to a plot by Dick Cheney to further interests of John McCain against Barack Obama in the US presidential elections.

In 2007, having been accused of being behind cyberattacks on Estonian government's systems, Markov was declared persona non grata in Estonia and in 2008 he was also expelled from Ukraine. In late 2009, Markov said that he believes the Russian Black Sea Fleet should stay stationed in Ukraine "for the next 100 years" because he believes "It is the guarantor of security in the entire region."

In November 2016, following the election of Donald Trump in the United States, Markov dismissed alleged Russian interference in the presidential election, though he said "maybe we helped a bit with WikiLeaks." In 2020, Markov said that "All the hopes [Trump] raised in Russians were dashed. More sanctions, more tensions, less arms control, and almost no diplomatic dialogue is what we have today. But no one in Moscow has any hopes about Biden either."

Positions

International relations of Russia
Markov has criticized historians from states formerly under Soviet occupation, claiming they distort the historical record with the documentation of events like the Katyn massacre. In early May 2010, Markov demanded a "radical" change in Ukrainian textbooks about the history of Ukraine. He stated Ukrainian history textbooks can not be considered an internal affair of Ukraine, as they often displayed a negative attitude to Russia. On May 13, 2010, education minister of Ukraine Dmytro Tabachnyk announced that Ukraine and Russia intend to develop a common textbook for history teachers.

Markov has supported the prosecution and conviction of three members of Pussy Riot, a group which he sees as part of a foreign conspiracy against Russia. In August 2012, he wrote in an editorial that: "Pussy Riot's act inside the Cathedral of Christ the Saviour is not the stupidity of young girls, but part of the global conspiracy against Russia and the Russian Orthodox Church. ... According to this version [of events], Putin isn't obliged to just punish three idiots in a fatherly way, but also protect Russia from this conspiracy with all possible severity."

Prior to the Russian invasion of Ukraine in February 2022, Markov said that "It will not be a war against Ukraine, but to liberate Ukraine" from the pro-Western government that took power in 2014, adding that "a military operation now would prevent a wider war in future." In March 2022, Markov argued that the Russian invasion of Ukraine was not a "war between Russia and Ukraine, it’s a war between Russia and (the) United States puppet who now occupy Ukraine. It’s liberation of Ukraine and it’s a proxy war of United States against Russia. We believe there’s no independent Ukrainian government and this government is wholly under the control of the United States security community." Markov later admitted that the war in Ukraine was more difficult "than had been expected. It was expected that 30 to 50 percent of the Ukrainian Armed Forces would switch over to Russia’s side. No one is switching over." On Russia's disastrous performance in the war, Markov said "So far the results have been appalling because Russia wasn’t at all ready".

Gay rights in Russia
In an interview with Jason Jones aired in February 2014, Markov stated:
 There is real personal freedom in Russia. Nobody cares with whom you want to have sex. For example, you are absolutely free to make sex  with this table. ... You can many times repeat to me that "it's normal" or "it's absolutely freedom" , that "it's democracy", that "it's human right"  for you to make sex with this table. ... Having sex between man and woman: normal. Having sex between man and man: not normal. Everybody knows this. Including gays.

Russophobia and World War III
In an interview with Svenska Dagbladet, released June 8, 2014, Markov threatened that if Russia felt "backed into a corner" by Sweden and Finland joining NATO, combined with what he perceived as "Russophobia" from certain European countries, it could start World War III. In an interview with BBC Radio Four on September 21, 2022, Markov speculated that Russia would use nuclear weapons 'against the UK'.

References

 Public Chamber of Russian Federation

Russian political scientists
Members of the Civic Chamber of the Russian Federation
Fifth convocation members of the State Duma (Russian Federation)
Moscow State University alumni
Living people
1958 births